The 2014–15 Bosnia and Herzegovina Football Cup was the twentieth season of Bosnia and Herzegovina's annual football cup, and a fifteenth season of the unified competition.  The winner will qualify to the first qualifying round of the 2015–16 UEFA Europa League.

Sarajevo is the title holder, having won their fourth national cup title previous season.

Qualification
32 teams take part in the Cup. Berths allocation is shown below:
16 teams (each) from the 2014–15 edition of the Premier League of Bosnia and Herzegovina
10 teams from the 2014–15 edition of the Federation of Bosnia and Herzegovina Cup; Final stage winners
6 best teams from the 2013–14 season of the First League of the Republika Srpska; as 2 teams from Republika Srpska got relegated from previous season of Premier League, those two teams will qualify so 4 best teams from previous First League season will take part in Cup

Participating teams
Following teams will take part in 2014–15 Bosnia and Herzegovina Football Cup.

Roman number in brackets denote the level of respective league in Bosnian football league system

Calendar

First round
Played on 16/17 September 2014

Second round
Played on 30 September/1 October and 21/22 October 2014; over two legs

Quarter final
Played on 11 and 18 March 2015; over two legs

Semi final
Played on 15 and 29 April 2015; over two legs

First leg

Second leg

Final
Played on 20 and 27 May 2015; over two legs

First leg

Second leg

External links
Football Federation of Bosnia and Herzegovina
SportSport.ba

Bosnia and Herzegovina Football Cup seasons
Bosnia Cup